Henry Horn (1786January 12, 1862) was a Jacksonian member of the U.S. House of Representatives from Pennsylvania.

Biography
Henry Horn was born in Philadelphia, Pennsylvania.  He studied law, was admitted to the bar and practiced law in Philadelphia.

Horn was elected as a Jacksonian to the Twenty-second Congress.  He was an unsuccessful candidate for reelection to the Twenty-third Congress in 1832.  He resumed the practice of law in Philadelphia, and served as collector of customs at Philadelphia from May 12, 1845, until August 4, 1846.  He died in Flourtown, Pennsylvania, in 1862.  He was interred in Woodlands Cemetery in Philadelphia.

Sources

The Political Graveyard

External links

Pennsylvania lawyers
Politicians from Philadelphia
1786 births
1862 deaths
Burials at The Woodlands Cemetery
Jacksonian members of the United States House of Representatives from Pennsylvania
19th-century American politicians